Thomas Gibson Bowles (15 January 1842 – 12 January 1922) was a British publisher and parliamentarian. He founded the magazines The Lady and the English Vanity Fair, and became a Member of Parliament in 1892. He was also the maternal grandfather of the Mitford sisters.

Early life
Bowles was the illegitimate offspring of Thomas Milner Gibson and a servant named Susannah Bowles. He attended school in France and then studied for a year at King's College London. His father gave him a yearly stipend of £90 and helped him find a job at Somerset House.

Career
He began his journalism and publishing career by writing a column for the Morning Post in 1866. His coverage of the Siege of Paris sent by balloon and pigeon post ensured his fame.

He borrowed £200 to found Vanity Fair in 1868. Shattered by the death of his wife Jessica (née Evans-Gordon) in childbirth, he sold his stake in Vanity Fair to Arthur H. Evans in 1887 for £20,000. He founded The Lady magazine in 1885, supposedly spurred by advice Jessica had once given to him. He became a competent sailor and wrote for decades in support of the Royal Navy. Bowles (nicknamed Jehu Junior after a biblical prophet who effected the downfall of his enemies) compiled the biographical notes that went with the caricatures. He was editor for twenty years and shaped magazine policy so that no-one was exempt from his enquiring eye. This approach made for an entertaining and popular magazine.

The targets of Jehu Junior's satire usually considered themselves honoured to have been chosen, and although the scrutiny was acute, it was humorous rather than malicious. Bowles managed to achieve this extraordinarily difficult balancing act throughout his association with the magazine.

Political career
At the 1892 general election, he was elected as Conservative Party Member of Parliament for King's Lynn and served in the House of Commons until losing his seat at the 1906 election.  He was re-elected at the January 1910 as a Liberal, but lost his seat again at the December 1910 election. He stood in the 1916 Harborough by-election as an independent.

Personal life
In 1875, he married Jessica Evans-Gordon (1852–1887), daughter of Gen. Charles Evans-Gordon (1813–1901), a descendant of the Lochinvar branch of Clan Gordon, by his wife Catherine (née Rose), daughter of Rev. Alexander Rose and Janet McIntosh of Inverness. Before her death in 1887, they were the parents of:

 George Frederic Stewart Bowles (1877–1955), a barrister and MP who married Madeline Mary Tobin.
 Geoffrey Bowles (1879–1968), a Commander of the Royal Navy.
 Sydney Bowles (1880–1963), married the Hon. David Mitford in 1902, and was the mother of the Mitford sisters.
 Dorothy Bowles (1885–1971), who married Col. Percy Bailey.

He died on 12 January 1922 while on a holiday at Algeciras, Spain, and is buried in Gibraltar.

Mitford Descendants
Through his elder daughter Sydney, he was a grandfather of Nancy, Pamela, Thomas, Diana, Unity, Jessica, and Deborah Mitford.

Relationship with Rita Shell
According to his granddaughter Julia Budworth, Bowles also fathered the last three of the four children of assistant Rita Shell (his children's governess, after the death of his wife Jessica Evans-Gordon), who changed her surname to Stewart.  She later became editor of The Lady.  They were Humphrey (b. 1891), Oliver (b. 1895) and Peter (b. 1900). Peter Stewart later assisted at Marlborough House when it was used by Queen Mary.

References

External links
 
 

1842 births
1922 deaths
Alumni of King's College London
Conservative Party (UK) MPs for English constituencies
Liberal Party (UK) MPs for English constituencies
UK MPs 1892–1895
UK MPs 1895–1900
UK MPs 1900–1906
UK MPs 1910
British magazine founders
British magazine publishers (people)
Vanity Fair (British magazine) people